Jaime Garza may refer to:

 Jaime Garza (boxer) (born 1959), Mexican American boxer
 Jaime Garza (actor) (1954–2021), Mexican actor